Carman Township is one of eleven townships in Henderson County, Illinois, USA.  As of the 2010 census, its population was 309 and it contained 287 housing units.

Geography

Cities, towns, villages
 Gulf Port (south portion)

Unincorporated towns
 Carman at 
 Carthage Lake at 
 Heapsville at 
 Shokokon at 
 Yellow Banks at 
(This list is based on USGS data and may include former settlements.)

Extinct towns
 Silver Lake at 
(These towns are listed as "historical" by the USGS.)

Cemeteries
The township contains Carman Cemetery.

Airports and landing strips
 Johnson Farm Airport

Rivers
 Mississippi River

Lakes
 Brush Lake
 Carthage Lake
 Fish Lake
 Goose Lake
 Lily Lake
 Long Lake
 Millman Lake
 Orchard City Lake
 Rhodes Lake
 Silver Lake

Demographics

School districts
 West Central Community Unit School District 235

Political districts
 Illinois's 17th congressional district
 State House District 94
 State Senate District 47

References
 United States Census Bureau 2008 TIGER/Line Shapefiles
 
 United States National Atlas

External links
 City-Data.com
 Illinois State Archives
 Township Officials of Illinois

Townships in Henderson County, Illinois
1906 establishments in Illinois
Populated places established in 1906
Townships in Illinois
Illinois populated places on the Mississippi River